The National University of Singapore (NUS) is a national public research university in Singapore. Founded in 1905 as the Straits Settlements and Federated Malay States Government Medical School, NUS is the oldest autonomous university in the country. It offers degree programmes in a wide range of disciplines at both the undergraduate and postgraduate levels, including in the sciences, medicine and dentistry, design and environment, law, arts and social sciences, engineering, business, computing, and music.

NUS is one of the most highly ranked academic institutions in the world. It has consistently featured in the top 30 of the QS World University Rankings and the Times Higher Education World University Rankings, and in the top 100 of the Academic Ranking of World Universities. As of 2022–2023, NUS is 11th worldwide according to QS  and 19th worldwide according to THE.

The Duke–NUS Medical School, a postgraduate medical school jointly established with Duke University, is located at the Outram campus; and its Bukit Timah campus houses the Faculty of Law and Lee Kuan Yew School of Public Policy. The Yale-NUS College, a joint liberal arts college between NUS and Yale University, is located next to the NUS University Town on the main campus.

NUS includes one Nobel laureate, one Tang Prize laureate and one Vautrin Lud Laureate among its affiliated faculty members and researchers.

History 

In September 1904, Tan Jiak Kim led a group of representatives of the Chinese and other non-European communities to petition the Governor of the Straits Settlements, Sir John Anderson, to establish a medical school in Singapore. It was noted by Anderson that there were other petitions prior which were not successful due to concerns over having a sufficient number of students and support from the local community. Tan, who was the first president of the Straits Chinese British Association, managed to raise 87,077 Straits dollars from the community, including a personal donation of $12,000. On 3 July 1905, the medical school was founded and was known as the Straits Settlements and Federated Malay States Government Medical School. At Anderson's directions, the school was hosted temporarily at a recently emptied block at a Government-run asylum in Pasir Panjang while providing the staff required to run the school.

In 1912, the medical school received an endowment of $120,000 from King Edward VII Memorial Fund, started by physician Lim Boon Keng. Subsequently, on 18 November 1913, the name of the school was changed to King Edward VII Medical School. In 1921, it was again changed to King Edward VII College of Medicine to reflect its academic status.

In 1928, Raffles College, a separate institution from the medical school, was established to promote education in arts and social sciences.

University of Malaya (1949–1962) 

On 8 October 1949, Raffles College was merged with King Edward VII College of Medicine to form the University of Malaya. The two institutions were merged to provide for the higher education needs of the Federation of Malaya.

The growth of University of Malaya was very rapid during the first decade of its establishment and resulted in the setting up of two autonomous divisions in 1959, one located in Singapore and the other in Kuala Lumpur.

Nanyang University (1955–1980) 

In 1955, Nanyang University (abbreviated Nan-tah, 南大) was established on the backdrop of the Chinese community in Singapore.

University of Singapore (1962–1980) 
In 1960, the governments of then Federation of Malaya and Singapore indicated their desire to change the status of the divisions into that of a national university. Legislation was passed in 1961, establishing the former Kuala Lumpur division as the University of Malaya, while the Singapore division was renamed the University of Singapore on 1 January 1962.

Present form 
The National University of Singapore (NUS) was formed with the merger of the University of Singapore and Nanyang University on 6 August 1980. This was done in part due to the government's desire to pool the two institutions' resources into a single, stronger entity and promote English as Singapore's main language of education. The original crest of Nanyang University with three intertwined rings was incorporated into the new coat-of-arms of NUS.

NUS began its entrepreneurial education endeavours in the 1980s, with the setting up of the Centre for Management of Innovation and Technopreneurship in 1988. In 2001, this was renamed the NUS Entrepreneurship Centre (NEC), and became a division of NUS Enterprise. NEC is currently headed by Wong Poh Kam and its activities are organised into four areas, including a business incubator, experiential education, entrepreneurship development and entrepreneurship research.

NUS has 17 faculties and schools across three campus locations in Singapore – Kent Ridge, Bukit Timah and Outram.

Education 
NUS has a semester-based modular system for conducting  undergraduate courses. It adopts features of the British system, such as small group teaching (tutorials) on top of regular two-hour lectures, and the American system (course credits). NUS has 17 faculties and schools across three campuses, including a music conservatory.

Reputation and rankings

Overall rankings 
NUS was ranked 11th worldwide (1st in Asia) in the Quacquarelli Symonds (QS) World University Rankings 2022, 19th worldwide in the Times Higher Education (THE) World University Rankings 2023, 26th worldwide in the U.S. News & World Report (USNWR) 2022-2023 Best Global Universities Rankings, and 71st worldwide in the Academic Ranking of World Universities (ARWU) 2022.

The Aggregate Ranking of Top Universities (ARTU), which sorts universities based on their aggregate performance across THE, QS, and ARWU, ranked NUS 28th worldwide in 2022.

In 2020, NUS is ranked 29th in the world by SCImago Institutions Rankings.

NUS placed 26th globally in the Informatics Institute/METU's University Ranking by Academic Performance (URAP) 2022–2023.

In the jointly published THE–QS World University Rankings from 2004 to 2009 (before THE and QS started publishing separate rankings in 2010), NUS was ranked globally 18th (2004), 22nd (2005), 19th (2006), 33rd (2007), 30th (2008 and 2009).

NUS was ranked 19th worldwide in the THE World Reputation Rankings 2022.

NUS was named the world's 10th most international university by THE in 2023.

Rankings by subjects / areas

QS Subject Ranking 
According to the QS World University Rankings by Subject 2022, NUS has been placed in the global top 10 in 16 subjects, among which petroleum engineering (1st), civil engineering (3rd), and chemical engineering (3rd) are the highest ranked. In total, 37 NUS programmes were ranked among world's top 50, making NUS the joint top university in Asia alongside The University of Tokyo. In 2022, Singapore had 23 programmes (16 from NUS and 7 from NTU) in the global top 10, the fourth highest number worldwide and the highest among Asia-Pacific economies.

According to the QS World University Rankings by Subject (broad subject areas) 2022, NUS was ranked:

Times Higher Education Subject Ranking 
According to the Times Higher Education World University Rankings by Subjects (2023)  which ranked universities in 11 different subjects, NUS was among the world's top 10 in three subjects (computer science, law, and engineering) and top 20 in four subjects (business and economics, physical sciences, clinical & health, and social sciences):

Financial Times' s Business School Rankings 
NUS's performance in the Business School Rankings by Financial Times:

Graduate employability rankings 
NUS graduates ranked 8th worldwide in the Times Higher Education's Global University Employability Ranking 2022, and 17th worldwide in the QS Graduate Employability Rankings 2022.

Organisation

Business

The NUS Business School was founded as the Department of Business Administration in 1965. The NUS Business School ranks 6th in the Forbes "The Best International MBAs: Two-Year Programs" and 21st in the Financial Times Global MBA Rankings 2022. NUS also offers MBA double degrees in collaboration with overseas universities such as Peking University, HEC Paris, and Yale University.

Computing

The School of Computing established in 1998, has two departments: Computer Science; and Information Systems and Analytics.

Dentistry

The Faculty of Dentistry traces its origins in 1929 as a Department of Dentistry within the King Edward VII College of Medicine. The faculty conducts a four-year dental course leading to a Bachelor of Dental Surgery degree.

Design and Engineering
The interdisciplinary College of Design and Engineering (CDE) was established in 2021, bringing together two pre-existing faculties, the School of Design and Environment (SDE) and the Faculty of Engineering (FoE).

Design and Environment
The School of Design and Environment has three departments: Department of Architecture; Department of the Built Environment; and the Division of Industrial Design.

Engineering
The Faculty of Engineering was established in 1968. It is the largest faculty in the university, and consists of several departments spanning diverse engineering fields.

The NUS Faculty of Engineering was ranked sixth in the world by the Academic Ranking of World Universities for Engineering/Technology and Computer Sciences. It has also been ranked seventh in the world in the subject category of Engineering and Technology by the 2017 QS World University Subject Rankings and 2016-2017 Times Higher Education World University Subject Rankings.

Humanities and Sciences
The interdisciplinary College of Humanities and Sciences (CHS) was established in 2020, merging the two largest faculties, the Faculty of Arts and Social Sciences, and the Faculty of Science.

Arts and Social Sciences 
The Faculty of Arts and Social Sciences has roots in Raffles College. Initially offering just four subjects: English, History, Geography and Economics, the Faculty now offers majors, minors and special programmes across 16 Departments. This includes the Centre for Language Studies, which teaches 12 different languages, and the Office of Programmes, which houses four multidisciplinary fields and five minor programmes. The South Asian Studies Programme is not officially classified as a department, but as a departmental entity.

Science
The Faculty of Science comprises multiple departments, spanning across natural and applied sciences. The first female Dean of the Faculty of Science was Gloria Lim, who was appointed in 1973. She served a four-year term and was reappointed in 1979, but resigned after one year to allow Koh Lip Lin to continue his post. In 1980, University of Singapore merged with Nanyang University to form NUS, resulting in overlapping posts.

Integrative Sciences and Engineering
The NUS Graduate School for Integrative Sciences and Engineering (NGS) was established in 2003. The principal purpose of NGS is "to promote integrative PhD research encompassing both laboratory work and coursework programmes which not only transcend traditional subject boundaries but also provides students with a depth of experience about science and the way it is carried out."

Law

The NUS Faculty of Law was first established as a Department of Law in the University of Malaya in 1956. The first law students were admitted to the Bukit Timah campus of the university the following year. In 1980, the faculty shifted to the Kent Ridge campus, but in 2006 it relocated back to the Bukit Timah site.

The faculty offers LLB, LLM, JD, and PhD programmes, alongside continuing education and graduate certificate programmes.

Medicine

The Yong Loo Lin School of Medicine at NUS was first established as the Straits Settlements and Federated Malay States Government Medical School in 1905. The School uses the British undergraduate medical system, offering a full-time undergraduate programme leading to a Bachelor of Medicine and Bachelor of Surgery (MBBS). For Nursing, the Bachelor of Science (Nursing) conducted by the Alice Lee Centre for Nursing Studies is offered. The department also offers postgraduate programmes in nursing, medicine, and medical science.

Duke–NUS Medical School

The Duke–NUS Medical School (Duke–NUS) is a graduate medical school in Singapore. The school was set up in April 2005 as the Duke–NUS Graduate Medical School, Singapore's second medical school, after the Yong Loo Lin School of Medicine, and before the Lee Kong Chian School of Medicine. The Duke–NUS Medical School is a collaboration between Duke University in North Carolina, United States and the National University of Singapore.

Music

The Yong Siew Toh Conservatory of Music (YSTCM) is a collaboration between NUS and the Peabody Institute of Johns Hopkins University. Singapore's first conservatory of music, YSTCM was founded as the Singapore Conservatory of Music in 2001. The School was renamed Yong Siew Toh Conservatory of Music after a gift was made by the family of the late Dr Yong Loo Lin in memory of his daughter.

Public Health
The Saw Swee Hock School of Public Health is Singapore's first and only tertiary education institution for public health. The school traces its origins to the University of Malaya's Department of Social Medicine and Public Health, formed in 1948.

Public Policy

The Lee Kuan Yew School of Public Policy was established in 2004 as an autonomous graduate school of NUS. Although the School was formally launched in 2004, it inherited NUS's Public Policy Programme, which was established in 1992 in partnership with Harvard University's Kennedy School of Government.

University Scholars Programme
The University Scholars Programme (USP) was an undergraduate academic programme established in 2001 in NUS, which comprised a compulsory general education programme. USP admitted 240 undergraduates annually. USP students resided in Cinnamon College at the NUS University Town.

Yale-NUS College

The Yale-NUS College is a liberal arts college in Singapore established in August 2013 as a joint project of Yale University and the National University of Singapore. It is an autonomous college within NUS, allowing it greater freedom to develop its own policies while tapping on the existing facilities and resources of the main university. Students who graduate receive a degree awarded by NUS. Pericles Lewis, a former professor at Yale, was appointed as the founding president in 2012.

In August 2021, NUS announced that it was going to merge Yale-NUS College with the University Scholars Programme to form a new honours college, NUS College, by 2025 The merger marks the dissolution of NUS's partnership with Yale University.  The last class of Yale-NUS College students were those admitted in 2021, following which Yale-NUS would operate for several years until all of its students have graduated.

Teaching centres 

NUS has a variety of teaching centres including:

Centre for Development of Teaching and Learning (CDTL)
Centre for Instructional Technology (CIT)
Centre for English Language Communication (CELC)
Institute of Systems Science (ISS), which offers professional IT continuing education
Centre for Teaching and Learning CTL at Yale-NUS College

NUS High School of Mathematics and Science 
 
NUS High School of Mathematics and Science is a school specialising in mathematics and science, and provides secondary and pre-tertiary education to  students with inclinations to these fields.

Research 
The major research focuses at NUS are biomedical science, physical science, engineering, nanoscience, material science, information technology, humanities, social sciences, and defence.

One of several niche research areas of strategic importance to Singapore being undertaken at NUS is bioengineering. Initiatives in this area include bioimaging, tissue engineering and tissue modulation.

The university has received a number of grants from the Bill & Melinda Gates Foundation for research into areas including vaccine development, water treatment, mobile devices in healthcare, iris recognition, synthetic antibodies, tuberculosis, and government response to the COVID-19 pandemic in Asia.

Research institutes and centres 
Currently, NUS hosts 21 university-level research institutes and centres (RICs) in various fields. Four of these RICs have been designated Research Centres of Excellence by the Singapore government — the Cancer Science Institute of Singapore, Centre for Quantum Technologies, Mechanobiology Institute, and Institute for Functional Intelligent Materials.

Besides university-level RICs, NUS also affiliates with other universities to establish research centres and institutes. The Logistics Institute – Asia Pacific is a collaborative effort between NUS and the Georgia Institute of Technology for research and education in logistics. The Next Age Institute, a partnership with Washington University in St. Louis, is the most recent cross-university centre involving NUS, established in February 2015.

Entrepreneurship 
NUS began its entrepreneurial education endeavours in the 1980s, establishing the Centre for Management of Innovation and Technopreneurship in 1988. In 2001, this was renamed the NUS Entrepreneurship Centre (NEC), and became a division of NUS Enterprise, the entrepreneurial arm of NUS. Its activities include entrepreneurial education and outreach, technology commercialisation, and a business incubator.

The NUS Overseas Colleges (NOC) programme was started in 2001, giving students the opportunity to experience, live, work and study in an entrepreneurial hub. Participants of the programme either spend 6 months or a year overseas, taking courses at partner universities and working in start-ups.

The NUS Industry Liaison Office (ILO) is another department that is involved in the creation of deep tech start-ups. It manages the university's technology transfer and promotes research collaborations with industry and partners. ILO manages NUS intellectual property, commercialises its intellectual assets and facilitates the spinning off of technologies into start-up companies.

Campus facilities and resources

IT and computing services 

NUS hosts NUSNET, an intranet, which is used in research, teaching, learning and administration. In 2004, a campus-wide grid computing network was deployed, connecting at least 1,000 computers. At the time, it was one of the largest of such virtual supercomputing facilities in the region.

Library services 
The NUS Libraries comprises eight libraries: the Central Library, Chinese Library, CJ Koh Law Library, Hon Sui Sen Memorial Library, the Medical Library, Music Library, Science Library and East Asian Institute Library. As of June 2017, there are 2,354,741 unique titles, and 26,074 microform resources in the collection.

NUS University Town
The NUS University Town (UTown) opened in August 2011. Located at the Kent Ridge campus, it was built on the site of a former golf course. UTown hosts the four residential colleges of NUS and also contains a graduate residence.

Transportation 
The university has a free Internal Shuttle Bus system that operates across the Bukit Timah and Kent Ridge campuses. In late 2022, the university started to deploy electric bus in partnership with CDG.

Student accommodation
NUS has three types of student accommodation: halls of residence, student residences, and residential colleges. There are about 6,000 residential places distributed between halls of residence and student residences on campus, in addition to around 4,100 students who live in the residential colleges and graduate residences.

Halls of residence 
NUS has 7 Halls of Residence with about 3,000 residential places. A points system, based on co-currciular activities and leadership roles, is used to allocate residential places to students. Halls have their own interest groups and student productions in addition to university-wide student co-curricular activities. Halls compete with each other in the Inter-Hall Games.

The Halls of Residence are:

 Eusoff Hall
 Kent Ridge Hall
 King Edward VII Hall
 Raffles Hall
 Sheares Hall
 Temasek Hall

Student residences 
NUS has two student residences — Prince George's Park Residences and UTown Residences — for undergraduate and graduate students. The residences are arranged in clusters of 11 to 15 single rooms, with shared kitchen and bathroom facilities. The UTown Residences also has apartments for students.

Residential colleges 
NUS also houses residential colleges, which are modeled after the college systems of universities. Like halls, residential colleges have unique co-curricular activities. Residential colleges also have their own academic programmes, with general education requirements differing from each other and the rest of the university. The academic programmes in residential colleges take place in seminars.

Cinnamon College/West Wing
Cinnamon College housed the University Scholars Programme (USP) until the 2021 intake. Together with the current Yale-NUS College Campus (which has been renamed the "West Wing"), the college will house the NUS College from the 2022 intake onwards. USP students and faculty are accommodated in 600 rooms.

Tembusu College
Tembusu College was the second residential colleges in NUS University Town. Tembusu houses mainly first and second-year undergraduates, in addition to resident faculty, visiting scholars and graduate fellows. The former founding Rector of Tembusu College is Singapore's Ambassador-at-Large and former United Nations Ambassador Tommy Koh, who is also the former Dean of the NUS Faculty of Law.

College of Alice & Peter Tan
The College of Alice & Peter Tan (CAPT) is a Residential College for all NUS undergraduates which emphasizes active citizenship and community engagement. It provides a two-year academic programme.

Residential College 4
Residential College 4 (RC4) is another Residential College in NUS.

Ridge View Residential College

Ridge View Residential College (RVRC) was formally established in April 2014, housed in the former Ridge View Residences. It is the only residential college that is situated outside University Town. The site was the former location for Kent Ridge Hall until November 2002. In November 2015, an annex building to RVRC was constructed. It was completed in February 2017.

List of principal officers 
The following table is a list of the principal officers of the National University of Singapore's predecessors. Note that the office of the President of Raffles College was renamed Principal of Raffles College from 1938.

Notable alumni

Since its inception in 1905, NUS has had many distinguished alumni from Singapore and Malaysia, including two Singapore Prime Ministers and four Singapore Presidents, two Malaysian Prime Ministers, and many politicians, judiciaries, business executives, educators and local celebrities. It counts among its graduates, heads of state/government Abdul Razak Hussein, Benjamin Sheares, Goh Chok Tong, Mahathir Mohamad and S. R. Nathan. The first prime minister of Singapore, Lee Kuan Yew, attended Raffles College briefly prior to World War II.

A number of its graduates are also notable politicians such as Rais Yatim, Malaysia's former Minister of Information, Communications and Culture, Ng Eng Hen, Singapore's Minister for Defence, Vivian Balakrishnan, Singapore's Minister for Foreign Affairs, and S. Jayakumar, Singapore's former Deputy Prime Minister.

Many of Singapore's business leaders come from NUS, including as former Chairman of the Singapore Exchange, and Singapore Tourism Board Chew Choon Seng, CEO of the Hyflux Group Olivia Lum, former CEO of the Temasek Holdings Ho Ching, Chairman of SPRING Singapore Philip Yeo and CEO of Razer Inc Min-Liang Tan.

In international politics, NUS counts among its graduates former Director-General of the World Health Organization Margaret Chan, former President of the United Nations Security Council Kishore Mahbubani, and vice-president of the International Olympic Committee Ng Ser Miang.

NUS had served as Singapore's only law school for half a century, until the SMU School of Law was set up in 2007. Many of Singapore's judges and lawyers come from the school. This includes Singapore's Minister for Law, and Home Affairs K. Shanmugam, the fourth Chief Justice of Singapore Sundaresh Menon and the third Chief Justice of Singapore Chan Sek Keong.

In academia, NUS faculty include former vice-president of Finance for the University of Virginia, and Cornell University Yoke San Reynolds, and former Vice-Chancellor of the University of Hong Kong Wang Gungwu.

See also 

 National University Hospital
 Nanyang University
 S*, a collaboration between seven universities and the Karolinska Institutet for training in bioinformatics and genomics

References

External links 

 
 National University of Singapore official site

 
ASEAN University Network
Educational institutions established in 1980
Education in Singapore
1980 establishments in Singapore
Queenstown, Singapore
Tanglin
Autonomous Universities in Singapore